The men's 1500 metres event at the 1985 Summer Universiade was held at the Kobe Universiade Memorial Stadium in Kobe on 30 and 31 August 1985.

Medalists

Results

Heats

Final

References

Athletics at the 1985 Summer Universiade
1985